Ramazan Gül (born 14 February 1967) is a Turkish boxer. He competed in the men's flyweight event at the 1988 Summer Olympics. At the 1988 Summer Olympics, he defeated John Lyon of Great Britain, before losing to Gamal El-Din El-Koumy of Egypt.

References

1967 births
Living people
Turkish male boxers
Olympic boxers of Turkey
Boxers at the 1988 Summer Olympics
Place of birth missing (living people)
Flyweight boxers
20th-century Turkish people